"Enemies, foreign and domestic" is a phrase out of the US oath of office. It may also refer to: 

 The West Wing, season 3, episode 62